The 2011 K League, officially known as Hyundai Oilbank K-League 2011, was the 29th season of the K League. It was sponsored by Hyundai Oilbank.

Teams

General information

Managerial changes

Regular season

League table

Positions by matchday

Results

Championship playoffs

Bracket

Final table

Player statistics

Top scorers

Top assist providers

Awards

Main awards

Best XI

Source:

Attendance

Attendance by club

Top matches

See also
2011 in South Korean football
2011 K League Championship
2011 Korean League Cup
2011 Korean FA Cup

References

External links
Official website 
Review at K League 

K League seasons
1
South Korea
South Korea